The Ogdru Hem are fictional supervillains in the Hellboy universe. After awakening, the demonic Ogdru Jahad gave birth to the 369 Ogdru Hem. The Ogdru Hem are essentially weaker versions of their parents, but even so they wield unimaginable power. All of the Ogdru Hem were imprisoned by the Watchers, but many are now re-emerging, with the aid of Rasputin and other agents of the Ogdru Jahad.

Many of the Ogdru Hem are without bodies and exist, invisibly, in the air. These evil spirits are used to help raise the Ogdru Hem that have bodies (such as Katha-Hem) out of their earthly prisons.

Known Ogdru Hem

Sadu-Hem

Imprisoned on Earth so that the Ogdru Jahad would "always have a foothold in the world from which they were banished", Physically, Sadu-Hem appeared as a gruesome fungal mass of tentacles and snapping claws, with a cluster of eyes and feelers serving as its head. Sadu-Hem was discovered by Rasputin in the Gorinium temple at the top of the Arctic Circle. Rasputin remained in a trance near the statue until he was awakened the arrival of Professor Trevor Bruttenholm and the Cavendish exploration party. The newly revived being devoured most of Bruttenholm's exploration party, turning the Cavendish brothers and Sven Olafssen into frog creatures. Bruttenholm was allowed, under heavy psychological compulsion, to return to America to enact Rasputin's scheme to bring Hellboy to Cavendish Hall, with Sadu-Hem installed in the caverns. Sadu-Hem was to act as the conduit between Rasputin and the Ogdru Jahad, but was destroyed after Abe Sapien speared Rasputin to death and Liz Sherman set the entire place on fire.

Although Sadu-Hem was apparently destroyed, a small piece of the creature was discovered in the Cavendish Hall ruins over a decade later. Director Manning had the specimen of fungus preserved in a New Jersey lab, until Sadu-Hem grew strong enough to possess a human host and escape. Fleeing to Crab Point, Michigan, Sadu-Hem converted an entire town into vicious frog monsters before he was again immolated by Liz Sherman.

At the end of the first Hellboy film, Rasputin releases from his body a giant monster simply referred to as the Behemoth, which Hellboy fights and destroys. The Behemoth's appearance is similar to Sadu-Hem.

Urgo-Hem

Urgo-Hem was freed from imprisonment through the blood of a 16th-century Spanish priest. The priest had spent time in Tenochtitlan before it burned, and had learned the history of the Ogdru Hem there. After being persecuted by the inquisition for his knowledge, the priest was eventually squirrelled away by a secret order dedicated to preserving treasures of the ancient world. When Hellboy stumbled across him, the priest's blood released Urgo-Hem. Apparently an aquatic beast, this child of the Ogdru Jahad resembled an eyeless serpent with sharp crustacean legs lining its pale underbelly. After a bloody conflict, Urgo Hem impaled itself on the mast of a nearby shipwreck, and Hellboy escaped.

A creature similar in appearance to Urgo-Hem appears in "The Sword of Storms" animated film, where Liz immolates it, after a prolonged battle near the ocean.

Katha-Hem

Katha-Hem was the third of the Ogdru Hem to be set loose upon the world, and by far the most powerful. While Sadu-Hem was foretold to bring about the plague of frogs, the arrival of Katha-Hem was an indication that the world would begin to change. 

Summoned out of the ether by the occult rituals of the frog monsters and the Zinco Corporation's Mr. Pope, (also known as the Black Flame) Katha-Hem towered as large as a mountain and began marching across the Midwestern United States. Atop a tripod of spidery legs, Katha-Hem resembled a twisted, tentacled tree, its canopy an inferno of hellish blue fire, and numerous green-toothed maws lining its trunk. American artillery failed to make a dent in the mammoth creature, while any humans who ventured too close were turned into monsters by a strange green gas emitted from its body. Just as the President was about to resort to a nuclear strike, the BPRD's Liz Sherman managed to burn Katha-Hem to ashes, using an ancient artifact that mysteriously amplified her powers a thousand times.

The Conqueror Worm
The Conqueror Worm from the graphic novel Hellboy: Conqueror Worm was a member of a race of space-born monsters that wished to destroy the Earth. It possessed abilities similar to the Ogdru Hem such as turning people into frog monsters (like Sadu-Hem and Katha Hem) with its otherworldly breath and was preparing to devour the entire planet when it was defeated by Roger the Homunculus with aid from the ghost of Lobster Johnson.

It was told that once the Worm had destroyed all life on earth, it would call out to the rest of its space-borne brethren who would then use their power to restore the Ogdru Hem who would then release the Ogdru Jahad from their prison.

The Salton Sea Monster
This creature emerges from the Salton Sea during the worldwide upheaval seemingly caused by Liz Sherman. It has a reptilian/crustacean body with a long neck and arthropod-like head, from which emit scarlet-coloured vapours that cause humans who inhale them (such as the crew and passengers of a passing airliner) to mutate into grey, arthropod-like monsters.

When the Black Flame is returned to Earth, the Monster begins to walk off in an unspecified direction, leaving some eggs in its wake. One of these eggs hatches and goes into the Salton Sea, where it dies (as discovered by Abe Sapien during his visit to the Sea), and another is destroyed by Fenix to undermine a cult that has formed around it.

References

Fictional demons and devils
Hellboy characters
Fictional monsters
Characters created by Mike Mignola